Otto Stransky (1889–1932) was an Austrian composer. He worked in the German film industry for a number of years. He also composed a number of operettas. He died in 1932 following a car accident.

Selected filmography
 His Majesty's Lieutenant (1929)
 Two Worlds (1930)
 The Blonde Nightingale (1930)
 Queen of the Night (1931)
 The Opera Ball (1931)
 A Night at the Grand Hotel (1931)
 The Night Without Pause (1931)
 I Go Out and You Stay Here (1931)
 The Testament of Cornelius Gulden (1932)
 This One or None (1932)
 Grandstand for General Staff (1932)
 After the Ball (1932)
 The Telephone Operator (1932)
 Marion, That's Not Nice (1933)
 Model Wanted (1933)
 A Thousand for One Night (1933)
 There Goes Susie (1934)

References

Bibliography
 Prawer, S.S. Between Two Worlds: The Jewish Presence in German and Austrian Film, 1910-1933. Berghahn Books, 2005.

External links

1889 births
1932 deaths
Film people from Brno
People from the Margraviate of Moravia
Austrian composers
Musicians from Brno
Austrian people of Moravian-German descent